Treasure Island is a 1977 television adaptation of Robert Louis Stevenson's famous 1883 novel. It was filmed in 1977 on location in Plymouth and Dartmouth (Devon), and in Corsica, and also at BBC Television Centre at Wood Lane, London.

Plot
Jim Hawkins (Ashley Knight) discovers a treasure map and embarks on a journey to find the treasure, but pirates led by Long John Silver (Alfred Burke) have plans to take the treasure for themselves by way of mutiny.  This four-episode adaptation by John Lucarotti, while particularly faithful to the original, adds an expanded narrative concerning the declining Daniel Hawkins, as well as clarifying Squire Trelawney's naiveté in trusting Blandly and Silver.

This takes place in the first episode; Billy Bones tempts Jim's father into arranging a two-man treasure voyage, the corrupt shipping agent Ezra Blandly guesses their intentions and tips off Silver, who hoodwinks and then cruelly tortures the information out of a hapless alcoholic Mr Arrow. Billy Bones plans founder, and Hawkins snr catches pneumonia in the rain, which finishes him.

Background
Lucarotti's additions to the original provide useful backstory, and the pirate idiom is sufficiently well captured for these additions not to be too obvious.

While the director, Michael E. Briant, has clearly made sure that all the characters are much more strongly defined on screen than they are in the novel, and has cast most of the great TV character actors of the 70s, Alfred Burke is a quite astonishing Sea Cook; slick, violent, cunning, and dangerously plausible.  The characterisation bears comparison with that of Robert Newton.

Cast
Alfred Burke as Long John Silver
Ashley Knight as Jim Hawkins
Jack Watson as Capt. Billy Bones
David Collings as Blind Pew
Thorley Walters as Squire John Trelawney
Anthony Bate as Dr. David Livesey
Roy Boyd as George Merry
Patrick Troughton as Israel Hands
Stephen Greif as Job Anderson
Talfryn Thomas as Tom Morgan
Paul Copley as Ben Gunn
Tim Condren as Seamus O'Brien
Richard Beale as Capt. Alexander Smollett
Roy Evans as Richard Joyce
Brian Croucher as John Hunter
Royston Tickner as Tom Redruth
Edward Peel as Abraham Grey
Jo Kendall as Sarah Hawkins
Terry Scully as Daniel Hawkins
Christopher Burgess as Black Dog
Ena Cabayo as Louisa Silver
Stephen Boswell as Dick Johnson
John Baskcomb as Ezra Blandly
Keith Bartlett as John
Max Faulkner as Sgt. Dance
Linal Haft as Joshua Arrow
Henry Knowles as Bill
Derrick Slater as Tom
Clive Wood as Dirk
John Dearth as Jeb

External links
 Director Michael E Briant on his career, making Treasure Island and working with Alfred Burke

BBC children's television shows
Television series based on Treasure Island
1970s British children's television series
1977 British television series debuts
English-language television shows
1970s British television miniseries
1977 British television series endings